SS Robert Rowan was an American Liberty ship built in 1943 for service in World War II. Her namesake was Robert Rowan, an American politician.

Design 

Most Liberty ships were named after prominent deceased Americans.

Construction and career 
The keel of the ship was laid on 5 March 1943. Few months later the North Carolina Shipbuilding Company launched in Wilmington under the name Robert Rowan and commissioned later that year.

She was delivered to the Isthmain Steamship Company on 13 April. Her maiden voyage started on 14 May 1943 at Hampton Roads, Virginia to Oran as part of convoy UGS-8A. She was sent on to Gela, Sicily to support the invasion of Sicily (Operation Husky). She arrived at Gela 11 July 1943 with a cargo of ammunition and 334 soldiers of the 18th Infantry. She also carried 14 U.S. Navy personnel, 32 U.S. Navy armed guards, and 41 crewmen. During the battle of Gela the Rowan was hit by three 500 kg bombs. Just before 14:00 hrs German Junkers Ju 88 bombers appeared overhead and attacked the ships in the bay. One bomb passed through the ship, but the other two exploded in the holds. Because of the nature of the cargo the ship was abandoned without any attempt to put the fire out. All 421 men on board safely evacuated the ship and were picked up by PT boats and transferred to nearby destroyers. Within twenty minutes the fire reached her munitions with a tremendous explosion tearing the ship in half. The burning ship came to rest on an even keel and burned for two days. The destroyer USS McLanahan tried to sink the ship because the fires lit up the area during the night, but this failed as the water was too shallow. The hulk lay in the waters off Gela until 1948 when it was sold and scrapped.

Gallery

References

 

Liberty ships
Ships built in Wilmington, North Carolina
1943 ships
Maritime incidents in July 1943
Filmed killings
Shipwrecks of Italy
World War II shipwrecks in the Mediterranean Sea
Ships sunk by German aircraft